Main Centre is a hamlet in the Canadian province of Saskatchewan. Listed as a designated place by Statistics Canada, the hamlet had a reported population of 5 living in 3 of its 4 total private dwellings in the Canada 2011 Census.

It is notable for being the birthplace of Homer Groening, the father of The Simpsons creator Matt Groening.

References 

Former designated places in Saskatchewan
Excelsior No. 166, Saskatchewan
Hamlets in Saskatchewan